Jason Knapp may refer to:

 Jason Knapp (baseball), baseball pitcher
 Jason Knapp (sportscaster), American sportscaster